Tales from Soho was a British television series which aired in 1956 on the BBC. Only a single episode is known to remain in the archives.

Episode list
The Fiddle (21 January 1956) (extant)
The Message (28 January 1956)
Slippy Fives (4 February 1956)
The Protectors (11 February 1956)
The Ladder (18 February 1956)
Set a Thief (25 February 1956)

References

External links
Tales from Soho on IMDb

1956 British television series debuts
1956 British television series endings
Lost BBC episodes
English-language television shows
1950s British drama television series
Black-and-white British television shows
BBC television dramas